Horn of Plenty is the debut studio album by American rock band Grizzly Bear, released on November 9, 2004, by Kanine Records. Primarily a solo album by founding member Edward Droste, the album also features contributions from future drummer Christopher Bear. In 2006, the band released an EP, Sorry for the Delay, featuring tracks recorded during the same time period.

In 2005, a collection of remixes, Horn of Plenty (The Remixes), was released.

Background
In 2002, Ed Droste began writing and recording material under the moniker Grizzly Bear, following a painful break-up. Droste subsequently wrote and recorded Horn of Plenty, and subsequent EP, Sorry for the Delay, for "catharsis" and recorded it for friends. Horn of Plenty was originally released by Droste as CD-R in 2003 before being officially released through Kanine with a revised tracklisting a year later.

In 2006, Droste noted that he and Bear:

Regarding his contributions to the album, drummer and backing vocalist Christopher Bear stated, "I basically came into Grizzly Bear after [the album] was already finished. I helped Ed tie up some loose ends with Horn of Plenty, but that record was pretty much all him."

Track listing

Personnel
 Ed Droste - vocals, acoustic guitar, electric guitar, bass guitar, keyboards, piano, percussion
 Christopher Bear - drums, composition, vocals (track 6)
 Jared Barron - drums (tracks 4 and 11)
 Jamie Reeder - violin (track 12)
Artwork: Edward Droste, Jordan Mattos, Josh Faught, Patryce Bak

References

2004 albums
Grizzly Bear (band) albums
Kanine Records albums